Larkey Valley Wood is a  biological Site of Special Scientific Interest south of Canterbury in Kent. It is also a Local Nature Reserve and it is owned and managed by Canterbury City Council.

This wood has diverse ground flora with some uncommon plants and many breeding birds, such as tree pipits, nuthatches and hawfinches.  Flora include the scarce lady orchid.

There is access to the site from Cockering Road.

References

Sites of Special Scientific Interest in Kent
Forests and woodlands of Kent